Under a Billion Suns is the seventh studio album by Mudhoney, released in the United States in March 2006. It was recorded with three different producers: Phil Ek, Johnny Sangster and Tucker Martine.

The album was a further departure from Mudhoney's original grunge sound, and a continuation of the more commercial sound that began with their previous album. Of note is the unusual amount of saxophones and trumpets featured on the album. A few of the songs also feature female backing vocals.

The first few hundred copies pre-ordered from Sub Pop were autographed by the band, and came with a bonus CD featuring demos and remixes.

The song "Empty Shells" was featured on the "NHL 2K7" video game.

Writing and recording
The album includes backing vocals from Christy McWilson and Amy Allison on "Let's Drop In" and "I Saw the Light". Before the album was released co-founder of Sub Pop records Jonathan Poneman said that the album is more political than typical Mudhoney albums, while vocalist Mark Arm said "That may be a little exaggerated. There are four songs where those things are touched on. It's more kind of mocking than the stark, black or white approach." The song "Hard on for War" was written around the time of the U.S.'s 2003 invasion of Iraq. "On the Move," and "I Saw the Light" have been appearing in Mudhoney's recent live shows, Arm says the band wasn't particularly looking to fine-tune the material before it hit the studio.

Track listing
All songs composed by Mudhoney:
"Where Is the Future?" - 5:38
"It Is Us" - 3:28
"I Saw the Light" - 2:23
"Endless Yesterday" - 4:02
"Empty Shells" - 2:38
"Hard-On for War" - 3:57
"A Brief Celebration of Indifference" - 2:06
"Let's Drop In" - 4:40
"On the Move" - 4:46
"In Search Of..." - 5:02
"Blindspots" - 5:37

Bonus Disc
"Where Is the Future? (Remix)" - 8:01
"Hard-On for War (Rough Mix)" - 4:03
"Dig Those Trenches (Unreleased)" - 3:27
"On the Move (Johnny Sangster Version)" - 4:50
"It Is Us (Rough Mix)" - 3:31
"Blindspots (Rough Mix)" - 4:53

References

2006 albums
Mudhoney albums
Sub Pop albums
Albums produced by Tucker Martine
Albums produced by Phil Ek
Albums produced by Johnny Sangster